The 1927 Bradley Indians football team was an American football team that represented Bradley Polytechnic Institute—now known as Bradley University—as a member of the Illinois Intercollegiate Athletic Conference (IIAC) during the 1927 college football season. Led by eighth-year head coach Alfred J. Robertson, the Indians  compiled and overall record of 6–3 with a mark of 6–1 in conference play, winning the IIAC title for the third consecutive season.

Schedule

References

Bradley
Bradley Braves football seasons
Interstate Intercollegiate Athletic Conference football champion seasons
College football undefeated seasons
Bradley Indians football